Philip Elliot Slater (May 15, 1927 – June 20, 2013<ref>[http://www.sfgate.com/nation/article/Author-Harvard-LSD-tester-Philip-Slater-dies-4624452.php San Francisco Chronicle Author, Harvard LSD tester Philip Slater dies]</ref>) was an American sociologist and writer. He was the author of the bestselling 1970 book on American culture, The Pursuit of Loneliness (1970) and of numerous other books and articles.

He had an A.B. and Ph.D. from Harvard and taught sociology at Harvard, Brandeis, and University of California at Santa Cruz. He was Professor and Chairperson of the Brandeis Sociology Department in 1971 when he resigned to found, with Jacqueline Doyle and Morrie Schwartz, Greenhouse, a non-profit growth center, where he led encounter groups and personal growth workshops.

He was a merchant seaman, actor, business consultant, cookie salesman, marriage officiant, and president of a theatre. He collaborated with filmmaker Gene Searchinger on Paradox on 72nd Street, a one-hour TV documentary aired nationally by PBS, and acted in over 30 plays and films. In 1982, he was chosen by Ms. magazine as one of its "male heroes". Slater taught writing and playwriting at UCSC and in private workshops starting 1989. He returned to academia in his eighties, teaching in the doctoral program in Transformative Studies at the California Institute for Integral Studies.

Besides the influential 1970 bestseller The Pursuit of Loneliness, Slater was the author of nine other books of sociology and social commentary. He wrote more than 25 novels and plays. In a prescient 1964 Harvard Business Review article called, "Democracy is Inevitable," he and co-author Warren Bennis predicted the fall of the Soviet bloc and the rise of democracy: "Democracy... is the only system that can successfully cope with the changing demands of contemporary civilization." Slater believed fervently in democracy's adaptive superiority, an idea he would later develop in his last two books of nonfiction, A Dream Deferred (Beacon 1992) and The Chrysalis Effect'' (Sussex Academic Press 2008).

Born in 1927 in Riverton, New Jersey, Slater served in the United States Merchant Marine during World War II. He died of cancer in Santa Cruz, California at 86.

References

External links
Official site at philipslater.org (original philipslater.com no longer available)
 Writings at The Huffington Post
 "The World According to Slater", an article at the Harvard Magazine
 Harvard Magazine
 Wallace Baine, "An unconventional man: Harvard-educated sociologist Philip Slater came to Santa Cruz in pursuit of happiness" at the Santa Cruz Sentinel
 Amazon.com: Philip Slater: Books
 CS Pakarbet

1927 births
2013 deaths
People from Riverton, New Jersey
Harvard University alumni
Harvard University staff
Brandeis University faculty
University of California, Santa Cruz people
American male stage actors
United States Merchant Mariners of World War II
Deaths from cancer in California
Deaths from lymphoma